Sapindus trifoliatus, the South India soapnut or three-leaf soapberry, is a species of flowering plant in the family Sapindaceae, native to Pakistan, India, Bangladesh, the Andaman Islands, Myanmar, and Sri Lanka, and introduced to eastern tropical Africa, Rodrigues, and Trinidad and Tobago. An evergreen tree reaching , its seeds are rich in saponins, and are both collected in the wild and cultivated to make soap for washing fabrics.

References

trifoliatus
Non-timber forest products
Flora of Pakistan
Flora of India (region)
Flora of Bangladesh
Flora of the Andaman Islands
Flora of Myanmar
Flora of Sri Lanka
Taxa named by Carl Linnaeus
Plants described in 1753